Ciputra Waterpark is a waterpark located in Surabaya. It is one of the biggest waterparks in Southeast Asia. It is located at the western part of Surabaya.

External links

Buildings and structures in Surabaya
Amusement parks in Indonesia
Tourist attractions in East Java